Piotr Orczyk (born 19 March 1993) is a Polish volleyball player. At the professional club level, he plays for Trefl Gdańsk.

Honours

Clubs
 National championships
 2014/2015  Belgian Cup, with Volley Aalst
 2015/2016  Belgian Cup, with Knack Roeselare
 2015/2016  Belgian Championship, with Knack Roeselare
 2016/2017  Belgian Cup, with Knack Roeselare
 2016/2017  Belgian Championship, with Knack Roeselare
 2017/2018  Belgian Cup, with Knack Roeselare
 2018/2019  Polish SuperCup, with PGE Skra Bełchatów

References

External links
 
 Player profile at PlusLiga.pl 
 Player profile at Volleybox.net

1993 births
Living people
Sportspeople from Łódź
Polish men's volleyball players
Polish expatriate sportspeople in Belgium
Expatriate volleyball players in Belgium
Effector Kielce players
Skra Bełchatów players
Warta Zawiercie players
Trefl Gdańsk players
Outside hitters